The Divine Word Hospital also known as Saint Arnold Medical Mission, Inc. is a DOH-accredited level 3 general hospital in Tacloban, Philippines. Formerly known as St. Pauls' Hospital, it is a private health facility managed by the Benedictine Sisters in the Philippines.

References

Hospitals in the Philippines
Buildings and structures in Tacloban